The Fortunate is an epithet applied to the following:

People:
Dietrich, Count of Oldenburg (c. 1398–1440)
Duncan Campbell, 1st Lord Campbell (died 1453), an important figure in Scottish affairs
Manuel I of Portugal (1469–1521), King of Portugal and the Algarves
Philip VI of France (1293–1350), King of France

Fictional characters:
the protagonist of the novel Bellarion the Fortunate by Rafael Sabatini

See also
List of people known as Lucky or the Lucky
List of people known as the Unfortunate

Lists of people by epithet